Corioli was a town in ancient times in the territory of the Volsci in central Italy, in Latium adiectum.

Etymology
Linguist Roger Woodard, based on McCone, suggests the name of the town, Corioli, may derive from the Proto-Indo-European root *kóryos, meaning 'army'. Therefore, the town name would mean something akin to 'army camp'.

Historical location
The town was located south of Rome, north of the Volscian capital Antium. Scholarship points that Corioli, along with Polusca and Longula, are mentioned together in ancient sources, yet disappear from the historical record "after the legendary age".

In 493 BC a Roman army under the command of the consul Postumus Cominius Auruncus laid siege to the town. However, whilst the Romans were focussed on the siege, another Volscian force arrived from Antium and attacked the Romans, and at the same time the soldiers of Corioli launched a sally. A young noble Roman, Gaius Marcius held watch at the time of the Volscian attack. He quickly gathered a small force of Roman soldiers to fight against the Volscians who had sallied forth from Corioli. Not only did he repel the enemy, but he charged through the town gates and then began setting fire to some of the houses bordering the town wall. The citizens of Corioli cried out, and the whole Volscian force was dispirited and was defeated by the Romans. The town was captured, and Marcius gained the cognomen Coriolanus.

It was retaken for the Volsci in around 488 BC by Coriolanus who, in disgust at his treatment by his countrymen, had deserted to the enemy. These events were fictionalized in William Shakespeare's play Coriolanus.

After this it does not appear in history, and we hear soon afterwards (446 BC) of a dispute between Ardea and Aricia about some land which had been part of the territory of Corioli, but had at an unknown date passed to Rome with Corioli.

References

Further reading
 Gagé, Jean. "Les chevaliers romains et les grains de Cérès au Ve siècle avant J.-C. À propos de l'épisode de Spurius Maelius". In: Annales. Économies, Sociétés, Civilisations. 25e année, N. 2, 1970. pp. 287–311. [DOI: https://doi.org/10.3406/ahess.1970.422218] ; www.persee.fr/doc/ahess_0395-2649_1970_num_25_2_422218

5th century BC in the Roman Republic
Volsci
Historical regions